SV Türkspor Bremen-Nord is a German association football club from the district of Blumenthal in the city of Bremen. It was founded by Turkish immigrants.

History
The club was established in 1977. The club won its way into the Landesliga Bremen (V) in 2004, and after finishing as runners-up in 2008, advanced to the Bremen-Liga (VI). The team's best result there to date was a 6th-place finish in 2010. After finishing last in the league in 2014–15, the club was relegated from the Bremen-Liga.

Honours
The club's honours:
 Landesliga Bremen
 Runners-up: 2008

References

Football clubs in Germany
1977 establishments in Germany
Turkspor
Association football clubs established in 1977
Migrant workers football clubs in Germany
Turkish association football clubs outside Turkey